Sweeney 2 is a 1978 British action crime drama film. It was made as a sequel to the successful 1977 film Sweeney!. Both films are an extension of the popular British ITV television series The Sweeney (1975–78). Some of the action in the film is transferred from the usual London setting to Malta.

The series and films depict a fictionalised version of the Flying Squad. The term The Sweeney is derived from Cockney rhyming slang, originating in the expression Sweeney Todd: Flying Squad, and is a real term used by the London underworld to refer to the Squad, whose brief was to investigate armed robbery within the Metropolitan Police District (MPD), an area roughly corresponding to Greater London.

The film centres on the investigations of the fictional Detective Inspector Jack Regan (John Thaw) and his partner Detective Sergeant George Carter (Dennis Waterman).

Plot 
A group of particularly violent armed robbers, who are committing bank and payroll robberies across London, are taking just £60,000 from each robbery, leaving behind cash in excess of this sum. The robbers are willing to kill anyone who gets in their way: they even kill badly injured members of their team to ensure they cannot inform. As Regan puts it after the first raid, "I've never seen so many dead people". Meanwhile, a subplot takes place in a large hotel, in which the Flying Squad deals with an eccentric man armed with a bomb (who turns out to be in the CIA).

A bent senior officer, Detective Chief Superintendent Jupp (Denholm Elliott), is asked to resign over allegations of corruption, and – just before leaving his post – instructs his subordinate, Regan, to take down the gang. The gang, armed with gold-plated Purdey shotguns, evade the Flying Squad for quite some time, leaving a trail that leads Regan to Malta and back, before he finds encouragement from Jupp, who meanwhile has been convicted of corruption – Regan having refused to testify in court for him.

Cast 
 John Thaw as Detective Inspector Jack Regan
 Dennis Waterman as Detective Sergeant George Carter
 Denholm Elliott as ex-Detective Chief Superintendent Jupp
 Ken Hutchison as Hill
 Anna Gaël as Mrs. Hill
 Lewis Fiander as Gorran
 Nigel Hawthorne as Detective Chief Inspector Dilke
 Barry Stanton as Big John
 John Flanagan as Willard
 David Casey as Goodyear
 Derrick O'Connor as Llewelyn
 Frederick Treves as McKyle
 John Alkin as Detective Sergeant Tom Daniels  
 James Warrior as Detective Constable Jellyneck
 Brian Hall as Haughton

Production
Sweeney 2 is the second feature film based on Ian Kennedy Martin's original concept for The Sweeney. The first, Sweeney! (1977), followed three series on television.

Barry Spikings of EMI Films said he made the sequel "because there's a demand for it. The first Sweeney film was successful so we're filling the demand by making another one."

As seen with Denholm Elliott's character, the film-makers were not afraid to face the fact that there are such things as bent officers. The character may have been based on a real-life former head of the Flying Squad, who had been convicted at the Old Bailey on corruption charges in 1977.

The film tones down the violence of Sweeney!, although it does contain more nudity and swearing, resulting in its release with an AA-certificate (i.e. restricted to those 14 years and over), instead of the X-certificate (adults only) of its predecessor. However, the film is nevertheless significantly more violent than the TV series, and was re-rated as 18 when released on VHS in 1987.

Nigel Hawthorne appears as a bureaucratic senior officer, taking the role usually played in the television series by Garfield Morgan.

As with the previous film, a number of the supporting characters are played by actors who had appeared in the television series, including Lewis Fiander and Frederick Treves.

References

External links

1978 films
1978 crime films
British crime films 
Police detective films 
Films based on television series
Films set in London
EMI Films films
British sequel films
Films with screenplays by Troy Kennedy Martin
Films directed by Tom Clegg (director)
1970s English-language films
1970s British films